"Boys" is a song by American singer Sky Ferreira for her debut studio album, Night Time, My Time (2013). It was released on March 1, 2014, by Capitol Records as a free digital download from the album preceding its launch in the United Kingdom. It was written by Ferreira, Ariel Rechtshaid, and Justin Raisen, while it was produced by Rechtshaid and co-produced by Raisen. "Boys" is a pop, grunge, and new wave song that discusses Ferreira's happiness in having found her ideal boyfriend. The track received generally favorable reviews from contemporary music critics, who complimented its overall production.

Background and composition
In February 2014, it was reported that "Boys" would be serviced as the second single from Night Time, My Time, following its lead single "You're Not the One" which premiered in September 2013. Ferreira clarified via Twitter that the track would not serve as the album's official second single, and it was ultimately released as a free promotional digital download in the United Kingdom on March 1, 2014, preceding the launch of Night Time, My Time in the country. Its single cover depicts an orange-tinted close-up of Ferreira, placed in front of a water-textured background.

"Boys" appears as the opening track on Night Time, My Time with a duration of four minutes and forty seconds, although it is shortened by two seconds on its individual release. Jacques Peterson from Popdust recognized grunge and new wave music elements within "Boys", while Mike Wass from Idolator described the track as a "guitar-pop tune". Annie Zaleski from The A.V. Club stated that its lyrical content sees Ferreira "optimistic about love" after having found her ideal boyfriend.

Critical reception
"Boys" received generally favorable reviews from contemporary music critics. Writing for AllMusic, Heather Phares highlighted the song as one of three stand-out tracks from the record. Carrie Battan from Pitchfork joked that while Ferreira sounds "glum" in several points throughout the album, she "isn't afraid to address [the men in her life] in a purposefully grade-school tone" with the lyrics "Boys, they're a dime a dozen / Boys, they just make me mad". Elias Leight from PopMatters enjoyed the incorporation of "ringing blasts of guitar, played on buzz-saw setting", and shared a similar sentiment with Battan in regards to its lyrical content. Jordan Sargent from Spin complimented "Boys" for blending the "giddiness" of the optimistic lyrics "You put my faith back in boys" with an "electric pulse", which he credited to the "mental and physical exhaustion" Ferreira experienced in asserting her creative input during the production of the record.

Track listing

Credits and personnel
Credits adapted from the liner notes of Night Time, My Time.

Recording
 Recorded at Heavy Duty Studios (Los Angeles, California)
 Mastered at The Lodge (New York City)

Personnel

 Sky Ferreira – vocals
 Ariel Rechtshaid – production, recording, organ, guitar, programming
 Justin Raisen – co-production, recording, synths, guitar, programming
 David Schiffman – mixing
 Chris Kasych – Pro Tools engineering
 Mark Santangelo – Pro Tools engineering assistance
 Emily Lazar – mastering
 Rich Morales – mastering assistance

Release history

References

2013 songs
American new wave songs
Grunge songs
Sky Ferreira songs
Song recordings produced by Ariel Rechtshaid
Songs written by Ariel Rechtshaid
Songs written by Justin Raisen
Songs written by Sky Ferreira